Barren Township is a township in Jackson County, Arkansas, United States. Its total population was 910 as of the 2010 United States Census, an increase of 6.93 percent from 851 at the 2000 census.

According to the 2010 Census, Barren Township is located at  (35.487941, -91.539853).

References

External links 

Townships in Arkansas
Populated places in Jackson County, Arkansas